Benitses is a Greek village located about 14 kilometres south of the city of Corfu.

Population

References 

Populated places in Corfu (regional unit)